The Hughes AN/ASG-18 Fire Control System was a prototype airborne fire control radar system for the planned North American XF-108 Rapier interceptor aircraft, and the Lockheed YF-12 for the United States Air Force. It was the US's first Pulse-Doppler radar, giving it look-down/shoot-down capability, and was also the first track while scan radar (could track one target at a time). This was paired with an infrared search and track (IRST) system. The installation itself was massive, weighing 2,100 lb (953 kg), and taking up most of the nose of the aircraft. The system was to be used with the Hughes AIM-47 Falcon missile, which also had a range of about 100 miles.

While development work was done with the XF-108, the AN/ASG-18 and Falcon missiles were first tested on a highly modified Convair B-58 Hustler bomber. To fit the radar, the nose was lengthened nearly 7 feet (2.13 m), and the infrared sensors were mounted on either side of the forward fuselage. The resulting nose shape led to it being nicknamed "Snoopy". A single missile was housed in a specially built pod underneath the fuselage.

Before the test "Snoopy" could fly, the XF-108 program was cancelled, and the proposed Lockheed YF-12 interceptor was to instead receive the radar/missile system pair. Tests of the system were conducted first in 1960 and until 1963 only on the modified B-58, after which the YF-12 took over until the cancellation of the whole program in 1966.

References

AN ASG-18
Cold War military computer systems of the United States
Radars of the United States Air Force
Hughes Aircraft Company